The Chinese International School is a private international school in Hong Kong.

History 
The school opened in 1983, with an initial intake of approximately 75 students in Years 1 to 3. Its first location was at 7 Eastern Hospital Road in Causeway Bay.

In 1986 and 1989, the school expanded to additional sites at 10 Borrett Road and 26 Kennedy Road. In 1991, the school moved to the current campus on Braemar Hill.

In 2013, the school opened Hangzhou CIS, a one-year boarding program for Year 10 students.

In 2016, the school unveiled the new building, consisting of 9 floors with open space atriums from the 5th-7th floor.

Administration
The school is overseen by a Board of Governors of approximately fifteen members. The Board has been chaired by Andrew Brandler a parent of the school. Dr. Theodore S. Faunce served as Headmaster from 2006 to 2017. Deputy Head of School Li Bin served as Interim Head of School in 2017–18. In 2018, Sean Lynch was appointed to serve as the Headmaster of CIS.

See also 

 List of international schools

References

External links 
 

International schools in Hong Kong
Secondary schools in Hong Kong
International Baccalaureate schools in Hong Kong
Braemar Hill
Association of China and Mongolia International Schools
Educational institutions established in 1983
1983 establishments in Hong Kong